A kikoi is a traditional rectangle of woven cloth originating from Africa. Considered a part of Swahili culture, the kikoi is mostly worn by the Maasai people of Kenya  as well as men from Tanzania and Zanzibar. It is most commonly viewed a type of sarong.

Description
The kikoi is made of cotton and patterns are woven rather than dyed into the fabric. As with all sarongs, it is a single piece of cloth which is wrapped around the waist, and rolled over outwards a couple of times. Outside of their intended use as a sarong, they can be used as a sling to hold a baby, towel, or a head wrap.

History
The kikoi emerged from cultural exchange between East Africans and their trading partners from nations like Oman centuries ago.
In 1987, model Iman Abdul Majjid introduced kikois to the American market with distribution by the Echo Design Group. The garment remains a popular souvenir for tourists visiting Kenya.

Trademark controversy
In 2006, British company The Kikoy Company sought to trademark the word “kikoy” in the United Kingdom. Under the Cooperation for Fair Trade in Africa, Kenyan kikoi producers fought back against the trademark, arguing it would hurt their sales in the UK market. The Kikoy Company later withdrew their trademark application. Scholar Sonali Maulik cited the incident as an example of how international intellectual property law does not protect traditional cultural markers because the legal outcome of a challenge to the copyright application would be unclear.

References

African clothing
Skirts
Swahili culture